A number of ships have been named Aurora, including:

See also
, a number of motor vessels with this name

Ship names